The Jai Bharat Samanta Party was a political party in India. It was led by Madhu Koda, former Chief Minister of Jharkhand.

The party fielded nine candidates in the October 2009 Jharkhand Legislative Assembly election. One was elected: Geeta Koda, in the Jaganathpur constituency. In total, the party mustered 93,280 votes (0.91% of the votes in the state). On 1 November 2018, it merged into the Indian National Congress party.

References

Political parties in Jharkhand
Political parties established in 2009
2009 establishments in Jharkhand